Beat 103 is a community radio station based in Preston, Lancashire, broadcasting pop and dance music. It was initially established in 2008 as Preston FM before relaunching in 2015.

History

Preston FM 
Preston FM was initially operated by Prescap (Preston Community Arts Project), a local arts charity. It originally broadcast six Restricted Service Licence trials over three years from October 2005 to June 2008 and subsequently received a full-time community radio licence from Ofcom. The station was partly backed by EU funding. It broadcast a wide range of music and speech programming by local presenters and arts practitioners. Speech programming included the serialisation of a novel by a local writer.

In April 2012, the Prescap charity closed due to the loss of its Arts Council England funding. Preston FM was spun out into its own independent company to allow it to continue broadcasting, and moved out of Prescap's building into its own studios on Cannon Street.

In early January 2015, the station unexpectedly went off the air. It resumed broadcasting a few days later, but was unable to sustain itself long-term and Preston FM ceased broadcasting in 2015.

City Beat 
Following the closure of Preston FM, the station relaunched with a more mainstream commercial music format under the name City Beat 103.2, with new premises at Preston Guild Hall. In June 2017, the station was found in breach of its Ofcom licence after transphobic comments were made by the presenter of the Bigger Drive Home programme.

Beat 103 
In 2018, the station relaunched once again as Beat Radio and subsequently Beat 103, reflecting its FM frequency. In late 2019, the station once more fell off air following a number of problems, including the deletion of music and audio from the station's computers.

In May 2020, Beat 103 was again found in breach of its Ofcom licence. The regulator's investigation found that the station had not adhered to its Key Commitments on a number of levels, including the absence of any news, sport or speech programming, paying people to do shows when it key commitments was to have shows run by the community for the community  and a lack of older music tracks.

Transmission 
Beat 103 transmits on 103.2 MHz with an ERP of 25 watts from Guild Tower in Preston city centre.

References

Radio stations in Lancashire
Radio stations established in 2008
Community radio stations in the United Kingdom
Radio stations in the United Kingdom